List of different forms of racing.

Running 

Running is defined in sporting terms as a gait in which at some point all feet are off the ground at the same time. This is in contrast to walking, where one foot is always in contact with the ground. The term running can refer to any of a variety of speeds ranging from jogging to sprinting. Competitive running grew out of religious festivals in various areas.  The origins of the Olympics are shrouded in myth, though the first recorded game took place in 776 BCE. In Gaelic Ireland the Tailteann Games, which featured footraces, are attested from the 6th century CE; medieval chroniclers gave founding dates as early as 1829 BCE.
 Running
 Cross country running
 Fell running
 Road running
 Track running in track and field
 Trail running
 Tower running

Orienteering

Orienteering sports combine navigation with a specific method of travel.

Foot orienteering, navigation using a map and compass while running across unfamiliar terrain along a course with control points.
Mountain bike orienteering
Ski orienteering
Trail orienteering
Radio orienteering, combines radio direction finding with orienteering skills. Other variations are Fox Oring and Radio Orienteering in a Compact Area.
Canoe orienteering
Mounted orienteering
Rogaining, cross-country navigation between checkpoints in free order within a time frame.
 SportLabyrinth - micro orienteering
Mountain marathon, mountain navigation while running off-road over upland country.
Car orienteering

Walking
 Racewalking, a long-distance athletic event where one foot must be in contact with the ground at all times.

Rock climbing 
 Speed climbing, which can be performed as a race on a standardized, artificial speed climbing wall.

Swimming

 Swimming 
 Paralympic swimming
 Marathon swimming
 Open water swimming

Board racing
 Longboarding
 Sandboarding
 Slalom skateboarding
 Street luge

Cycling 
Bicycle racing:
 Track cycling, such as a Points race
 Road bicycle racing, such as the Tour de France
 Mountain biking, where a bicycle is ridden off-road
 Mountain bike orienteering, navigation along off-road trails and tracks
 Downhill mountain biking
 BMX racing (Bicycle Motocross)

Winter racing 
 Skiing
 Alpine skiing such as Slalom skiing, Downhill skiing, Giant slalom skiing,  Super Giant Slalom skiing, Ski cross and Speed skiing
 Cross-country skiing
 Ski-orienteering, that combines cross-country skiing and orienteering
 Biathlon, that combines cross-country skiing and rifle shooting
 Snowboard cross
 Skating
 Speed skating
 Ice cross downhill
 Sledding
 Bobsleigh
 Kicksled
 Luge
 Skeleton

Animal racing 

Animal racing:
 Bull racing (or Buffalo racing)
 Buffalo racing in Kerala
 Bull racing in Madura
 Camel racing
 Greyhound racing
 Horse racing, see also United Kingdom horse-racing and Equestrianism
 Chariot racing
 Flat racing
 Thoroughbred horse races, such as Triple Crown of Thoroughbred Racing or a Derby.
 Trotting
 Steeplechase
 Kambala
 Karapan sapi
 Lobster Racing
 Ostrich racing
 Pigeon racing
 Pig racing
 Sled dog racing, such as the Iditarod Trail Sled Dog Race
 Skijoring
 Snail racing
 Turtle Racing
 Zebra Racing

Air racing

 Drone racing

Motor racing

 All-terrain vehicle
 Auto racing (also known as automobile racing or autosport)
 Board track racing
 Drag racing
 Dirt track racing
 Ice racing
 Open wheel racing
 Formula racing
 Midget car racing
 Sprint car racing
 Offroad racing
 Pickup truck racing
 Production car racing
 Rally racing
 Rallycross
 Road racing
 Sports car racing
 Stock car racing
 Touring car racing
 Truck racing
 Kart racing
 Lawnmower racing
 Motorcycle racing
 Grand Prix motorcycle racing
 Pocketbike racing
 Production Bike Racing
 Superbike racing
 Track racing
 Flat Track
 Speedway
 Grasstrack (aka Long Track)
 Motocross
 Supercross
 Beachcross
 Supermoto (aka Supermotard)
 Snowmobile racing
 Motorboat racing
 Hydroplane racing
 Jet sprint boat racing
 Offshore powerboat racing
 Model racing
 Radio-controlled model racing
 Slot car racing

Boat racing 

 Canoe racing
 Canoe orienteering
 Drag boat racing
 Dragon boat racing
 Hydroplane racing
 Jet sprint boat racing
 Offshore powerboat racing
 Outrigger Canoe racing
 Rowing
 Sailing
 Yacht racing

Other types 
Some races involve multiple modes of transport:
Adventure racing
Kinetic sculpture racing
Surf lifesaving
 Marble Racing

Other races may involve board or video games:
 Race game
 Racing video game
 Speedrun

References

Racing